Antonio Labriola (2 July 1843 – 12 February 1904) was an Italian Marxist theoretician and philosopher. Although an academic philosopher and never an active member of any Marxist political party, his thought exerted influence on many political theorists in Italy during the early 20th century, including the founder of the Italian Liberal Party, Benedetto Croce, as well as the leaders of the Italian Communist Party, Antonio Gramsci and Amadeo Bordiga. He also influenced the Russian revolutionary and Soviet politician Leon Trotsky.

Biography
Labriola was born in Cassino (then in the Papal States), the son of a schoolteacher. In 1861, he entered the University of Naples. Upon graduating, he remained in Naples and became a schoolteacher. During this period, he pursued an interest in philosophy, history and ethnography. The early 1870s saw Labriola take up journalism, and his writings from this time expressed liberal and anticlerical views.

In 1874, Labriola was appointed as a professor in Rome, where he would spend the rest of his life teaching, writing, and debating. Although he had been critical of liberalism since 1873, his move towards Marxism was gradual, and he did not explicitly express a socialist viewpoint until 1889. He died in Rome on 2 February 1904.

Philosophical work
Heavily influenced by Georg Wilhelm Friedrich Hegel and Johann Friedrich Herbart, Labriola's approach to Marxist theory was more open-ended than that of theorists such as Karl Kautsky. He saw Marxism not as a final, self-sufficient schematisation of history, but rather as a collection of pointers to the understanding of human affairs.

These pointers needed to be somewhat imprecise if Marxism was to take into account the complicated social processes and variety of forces at work in history. Marxist theory was to be understood as a theory critical of ideology, in that it sees no truths as everlasting, and was ready to drop its own ideas if experience should so dictate. His description of Marxism as a "philosophy of praxis" would appear again in Gramsci's Prison Notebooks.

References

External links
 Antonio Labriola Archive at Marxists Internet Archive
 
 

1843 births
1904 deaths
People from Cassino
19th-century philosophers
Italian Marxists
Italian philosophers
Italian socialists
Marxist theorists
University of Naples Federico II alumni
Burials in the Protestant Cemetery, Rome
Spinoza scholars
19th-century Italian philosophers